Napalm Beach is an American rock band formed in Portland, Oregon. They are considered early innovators of the grunge sound. Nicholas Pell, writing for the Portland Mercury said "a huge influence on the grunge and alternative rock of the 1990s, Napalm Beach never had the name recognition of other Portland bands like Poison Idea or the Wipers." Napalm Beach shared the stage with bands such as X, Public Image Ltd., Joan Jett, Johnny Thunders, Gun Club, Bad Brains, Soundgarden, Screaming Trees, Mudhoney, Dead Moon, and Poison Idea.  They also toured Germany five times between 1989 and 1992.  During their long musical career they have released more than 30 studio and live recordings in various formats on a number of small independent labels in the U.S. and Germany.

At the core of the group was Chris Newman on guitar, and Sam Henry on drums. Sam Henry was the original drummer for the Wipers and Portland band The Rats (with Fred and Toody Cole) before joining Napalm Beach in 1981. The group went through thirteen bass players before Dave Dillinger came on board in 1989. The group's earliest recordings were done on the Trap label, owned by Greg Sage of the Wipers.

Courtney Love lived in the Napalm Beach band house in 1981.

Discography
{|class="wikitable"
!Year
!Title
!Record label
|-
|1981
|Trap Sampler LP with other artists (produced by Greg Sage).
|Trap (U.S.)
|-
|1983
|Live at the Met Cassette (produced by Greg Sage)
|Trap (U.S.)
|-
|1983
|Rock & Roll Hell Cassette (produced by Greg Sage)
|Trap (U.S.)
|-
|1984
|Pugsley Cassette
|Skullman (U.S.)
|-
|1985
|"Why Do Parties Have to End?" on Doomtown PDX:  Portland Punk '78-'85 Cassette
|Mississippi Records (U.S.)
|-
|1985
|Teen Dream Cassette
|Here After/Imperial (U.S.)
|-
|1986
|Napalm Beach (Teen Dream) LP
|Here After/Imperial (U.S.)
|-
|1986
|Moving to and Fro Cassette
|Skullman (U.S.)
|-
|1988
|Moving to and Fro LP
|Loves Simple Dreams (Germany)
|-
|1988
|Liquid Love Cassette, LP, CD
|Flying Heart (U.S.)
|-
|1990
|Fire Air and Water Cassette, LP, CD
|Satyricon (Germany)/Flying Heart (U.S.)
|-
|1990
|Satyricon...the Album LP (Compilation by a Portland nightclub called Satyricon, not the German label.)
|Satyricon (U.S.)
|-
|1990
|"Pugsley" 45rpm flexi-disc in Ptolemaic Terrascope magazine Vol.2, No.1, Sept. 1990.
|(U.K.)
|-
|1991
|Thunder Lizard LP, CD
|Satyricon (Germany)
|-
|1991
|Rumblin' Thunder:  Raw and Alive Over Germany LP (Live box set with Dead Moon)
|Heart is a Lonely Hunter aka Dream Hunter (Germany)
|-
|1991
|"Chatterbox" on A Tribute to Johnny Thunders 45rpm box set with other artists.
|Tim Kerr (U.S.)
|-
|1991
|"Just One Day" 45rpm flexi-disc in Howl magazine No.11 
|(Germany)
|-
|1992 
|Xmas With Satyricon CD (Live recording of five Napalm Beach songs plus two other artists).
|Satyricon (Germany)
|-
|1992 
|"Potential Suicide" on Eight Songs for Greg Sage and the Wipers 45rpm vinyl box set with other artists including Nirvana.
|Tim Kerr (U.S.)
|-
|1992
|Summertime Again/Last Big Heartache 45rpm single.
|Tim Kerr (U.S.)
|-
|1992
|Curiosities CD
|Satyricon (Germany)
|-
|1993
|Curiosities CD
|Tim Kerr (U.S.)
|-
|1993
|"Potential Suicide" on Fourteen Songs for Greg Sage CD with other artists including Nirvana.
|Tim Kerr (U.S.)
|-
|1993
|"My Master Calls" 45rpm flexi-disc with Poison Idea in Flipside Magazine.
|Tim Kerr (U.S.)
|-
|1994
|Volunteer CD (Although credited as a Chris Newman solo CD, all 12 songs are studio re-recordings of earlier Napalm Beach songs from the 1981 Trap Sampler LP, as well as the 1983 Rock and Roll Hell, and 1984 Pugsley cassettes.)
|Flying Heart (U.S.)
|-
|1994
|In My Tree CD
|CM/Shinola (U.S.)
|-
|1995
|In My Tree CD
|Dream Hunter (Germany)
|-
|2000
|History of Portland Punk, Vol. I CD 
|Zeno (U.S.)
|-
|2004
|Rock And Roll Hell CD (Combined digital re-release of the Live at the Met and Rock & Roll Hell cassettes)
|Zeno (U.S.)
|-
|2008
|Kill for My Bitch CD (Live recording of a reunion show)
|(U.S.)
|-
|2009
|Moving To And Fro CD (Vinyl transfer digital re-release of the original LP).
|Skullman (U.S.)
|-
|2011
|Teen Dream CD (Vinyl transfer digital re-release of the original LP).
|Skullman (U.S.)
|- 
|}

References

External links
Napalm Beach on Skullman Records
Napalm Beach on Youtube
Napalm Beach on Bandcamp

Musical groups from Portland, Oregon
Punk rock groups from Oregon
1981 establishments in Oregon
Musical groups established in 1981